Dormettingen is a town in the Zollernalbkreis district of Baden-Württemberg, Germany.

History
In 1805, Dormettingen, previously a possession of the County of Hohenberg and of Austria, became part of the Kingdom of Württemberg. Dormettingen doubled in size after World War II thanks to growth periods from the 1960s to the 1990s.

Geography
The village of Dormettingen itself is found in a shallow trough, where it originated as a Haufendorf. Elevation above sea level in the municipal area varies from a low of  Normalnull (NN) to a high of  NN.

The Federally-protected  nature reserve is located inside Dormettingen's municipal area.

Coat of arms
Dormettingen's coat of arms shows two white rake upon a field of red. The pattern is derived from a 19th century seal from the Schultheiß's office that also had a plowshare below the rakes. These items symbolize Dormettingen's agricultural history while it's red-white tincture reference bot the County of Hohenberg and Austria. That tincture, and the exclusion of the plowshare, were decided when the Federal Ministry of the Interior first awarded a coat of arms to Dormettingen on 16 May 1950. A corresponding flag was issued by the Zollernalb district office on 23 August 1982.

Transportation

Citations

External links
  (in German)

Towns in Baden-Württemberg
Württemberg